Four Days in October is a baseball documentary produced by ESPN and MLB Productions. It is episode 24 in the first season of ESPN's 30 for 30 series.

The film chronicles the last four games of the 2004 American League Championship Series (ALCS) between the Boston Red Sox and the New York Yankees. The series became famous when the Red Sox—who lost the first three games of the series to the Yankees—became the first team in Major League Baseball history to win a best-of-seven playoff series after falling behind 0–3.

The documentary begins with highlights of the Yankees–Red Sox rivalry over the years and then shows some highlights from Game 3, which was won by the Yankees 19–8 at Fenway Park in Boston. The show's narrative begins with Game 4. The Yankees stood just three outs away from sweeping the Red Sox at Fenway Park and advancing to their 40th World Series appearance. The series turned when the Red Sox rallied to tie the game in the 9th inning, and later won it on a home run by David Ortiz to keep the series alive. The ninth inning rally proved to be the turning point of the series, as the Red Sox proceeded to win the next three games, clinching the series at Yankee Stadium.

A week later, the Red Sox won all four games against the National League (NL) champion St. Louis Cardinals to win their first World Series championship in 86 years, ending the 2004 postseason on an eight-game winning streak.

While most of the commentary from the players in the documentary was done in the usual interview style that is customary of documentaries, Lenny Clarke and Bill Simmons were put in a pub setting, providing a conversation as fans, discussing their own experiences and feelings during the series.

Cast 
 Bronson Arroyo
 Lenny Clarke
 Johnny Damon
 Terry Francona
 Pedro Martínez
 Kevin Millar
 David Ortiz
 Dave Roberts
 Curt Schilling
 Bill Simmons

Notes

References

External links
 Film description at ESPN
 

2010 television films
2010 films
2010 documentary films
30 for 30
2010s sports films
ESPN
Boston Red Sox
Films about the New York Yankees
Documentary films about baseball
2010s American films